
This is a list of players who graduated from the Challenge Tour in 2022. The top 20 players on the Challenge Tour rankings in 2022 earned European Tour cards for 2023.

*European Tour rookie in 2023
†First-time full member, but ineligible for Rookie of the Year award

Wins on the European Tour in 2023

Runner-up finishes on the European Tour in 2023

See also
2022 European Tour Qualifying School graduates

References

Challenge Tour
European Tour
Challenge Tour Graduates
Challenge Tour Graduates